The 1956 LSU Tigers football team represented Louisiana State University during the 1956 NCAA University Division football season.  Under head coach Paul Dietzel, the Tigers had a record of 3–7 with an SEC record of 1–5. It was Dietzel's second season as head coach at LSU.

Schedule

References

Lsu Tigers
LSU Tigers football seasons
LSU Tigers football